Muhammad Shamsid-Deen (born January 16, 1969) is a former American football running back who played in the National Football League (NFL) for the Seattle Seahawks. He played college football at University of Tennessee at Chattanooga and was drafted in the eighth round of the 1992 NFL Draft. Shamsid-Deen was released from the Seahawks on August 31, 1992, but then later signed to the practice squad. After spending the 1992 and 1993 on the Seahawks practice squad Shamsid-Deen signed to play for the Toronto Argonauts of the Canadian Football League.

References

1969 births
Living people
American football running backs
Chattanooga Mocs football players
Seattle Seahawks players
People from Anderson, South Carolina
Sportspeople from DeKalb County, Georgia
Players of American football from Georgia (U.S. state)